Saint Hill Manor is a Grade II listed country manor house at Saint Hill Green, near East Grinstead in West Sussex, England. It was constructed in 1792 and had several notable owners before being purchased by L. Ron Hubbard and becoming the British headquarters of the Church of Scientology.

Early history
Saint Hill Manor was built by Gibbs Crawfurd in 1792, situated on 59 acres (239,000 m2) of landscaped gardens overlooking the hills of the High Weald. A number of archeological artefacts in the immediate area have been attributed to the existence of a small priory or early 17th-century dwelling on the site. The original name, Sinta Hill, is thought to have come from the local Roman occupation and later Medieval iron-workings found throughout the area. 

Subsequent owners included Edgar March Crookshank and Mrs. Drexel Biddle, who commissioned the famous Monkey Mural which was painted by John Spencer-Churchill, nephew of Sir Winston Churchill. It was once owned by William Thomas Berger and in the late 1800s served as the headquarters of the China Inland Mission. Hudson Taylor and Berger met there often and it was a centre for training recruits for the mission field.

Saint Hill Manor has been Grade II listed on the National Heritage List for England since August 1972.

L. Ron Hubbard purchase 
L. Ron Hubbard, the founder of the Scientology organisation, bought the mansion from Sawai Man Singh, the Maharajah of Jaipur, in 1959 after meeting at a casino in London. The Maharaja needed to settle his gambling debts. Hubbard claimed in a subsequent lecture that he purchased the property for £58,000. He lived there with his family until early 1966 before moving abroad.

Under Hubbard's ownership, the manor was extensively modified, with a series of extensions and new buildings constructed on the estate during the 1960s, 1970s and 1980s to accommodate the training facilities and attendant administration functions. The largest is a mock-Norman castle built adjacent to the main manor house after 1968 to provide a purpose-built training facility for Scientology followers. The East Grinstead Urban District Council initially refused planning permission. After a public enquiry, however, the Church of Scientology was granted permission to go ahead with the construction of "Saint Hill Castle".

Saint Hill Manor served as Hubbard's organisational headquarters until 1967. It was inaugurated in 1955 and was the site where Hubbard “announced Scientology milestones emerging from his research.” It was also the site of the organisation's first Distribution Centre, which was operative for the organisation's missionary outreach.

2015 renovations 
The Church of Scientology's renovations on the Saint Hill Manor were completed in the summer of 2015 and are reported to have cost a total of US$16 million. The organisation claims that they are preserving it as a “historic monument.” Its leader David Miscavige and Scientologist actor Tom Cruise donated $10,000 to cover the local rugby team's costs and invited team director Phil Major to an annual gala when their activities were disrupted for six months because of the renovations. Saint Hill Manor is now a museum that features the works of L. Ron Hubbard, and exhibits about what the Scientology organisation claims are his accomplishments.

Following the completion of the renovations, the Church of Scientology purchased seven brand new 29-seater ADL Enviro200 midibuses to transport the 400 staff members between the manor and the town of Crowborough, fourteen miles away.

References

External links

Advanced Organization & Saint Hill United Kingdom (official home page)
Saint Hill Manor (AboutBritain.com)
L. Ron Hubbard when living in Saint Hill (brief biography) - a favourable biography from a website with links to Church of Scientology
Scientology.org: L. Ron Hubbard A Chronicle (1959 - 1967)
Official Scientology UK site
Saint Hill (Jon Atack, A Piece Of Blue Sky, chapter 2)

Country houses in West Sussex
Mid Sussex District
Scientology properties
East Grinstead
Grade II listed houses
Grade II listed buildings in West Sussex
Scientology in the United Kingdom